is a fighting video game with music video game and role-playing game elements for the Nintendo DS developed by Dimps and published in Japan by Banpresto and Bandai Namco Games. It was then later published in the US by Atlus.

The fighting system is different from other fighting games in that there are not a lot of directional inputs needed for moves. Instead, special moves are set by collecting "Bullets" and then activating them with the DS's touch screen.

Story

The story of Draglade takes place in a post-modern setting where the world's primary source of power is a form of energy called "Matter." A piece of technology called a G-Con is capable of absorbing Matter and transforming it into a physical object. A weapon conjured by this means is called a Glade, which can emit a distinct sound when colliding with other objects. During the era that the events of Draglade take place, fighting using Glades is the world's most popular sport, called "Grapping." The story follows four characters on their own individual quests become professional Grappers. Each character has a personal colour, element, and type of glade.

Characters

Player characters

 Hibito - Hibito is a fiery youth who has idolized Grappers ever since he was saved by one as a young child from a wild variant. Against his grandfather's wishes, he travels around the continent to take the Grap Exams and become a Major Grapper.
 Guy - Once known as the "Shadow Fist", Guy used to belong to a corrupt Grapper gang called the "Black Fang". Like the others, he abused the power of Dark Glades, but he eventually abandoned the dark power, severely hampering himself. He is now taking the Grap Exams in order to train himself up to be able to fight and defeat the Black Fang.
 Kyle - Kyle is a pirate, son of the pirate Orca, who owns a large vessel known as the "Blue Whale". Orca has been tricked into working up a large debt, and Kyle ventures to become a Major Grapper so he can enter a Majors-only tournament with a cash-reward big enough to pay it off.
 Daichi - A kind young boy from Dolittle village, a place where the residents possess the unique ability to speak with animals, Daichi is one of two young people selected to take an important journey to help animals the world over, but only one can be selected. In order to prepare himself for the decisive match, he decides to train by taking the grap exam.
 Yuki - A young man that Hibito meets on his journey, Yuki at first is kind and helpful, but eventually it is revealed that he is not confident in his own abilities. He is led astray by the temptation of Dark Matter. However, after his second battle against Hibito, he realizes the truth and destroys the dark G-con.
 Gyamon - Gyamon is a well-known member of the "Black Fang" organization. He and Guy were considered two of the strongest grappers in the gang, and were rarely apart. He is commanded to find Guy and eliminate him for leaving, but instead he makes several attempts to persuade Guy back into the organization, claiming he misses "the good old days".
 Shelly - Shelly is a girl who seeks revenge for her brother, who wished to be a Major Grapper, but had his dreams destroyed when the "Black Fang" hurt him so badly he could never Grap again. She finds Guy and wishes to battle him to avenge her brother against the "Black Fang". She soon realizes that Guy has changed his ways.
 Asuka - Asuka is from the same village as Daichi and can thus also talk to animals. She was the second name chosen to represent her village, and aims to become a Major Grapper so she can prove she is the most worthy to represent her village; she does not believe Daichi can handle the responsibility because he is too slow and kind.
 Zeke - Zeke is a mysterious dark warrior that all the heroes encounter, and has great power and skill. He works for Mad Company, but is not truly interested in their goals. Once he has done what he was paid to do, he simply leaves.

Non player characters

 Cross - Cross was a legendary grapper that Hibito idolized, and he seemed like he was important when he met Hibito. It was said that the Hero of Light wields the blade to repel evil and summon clones of him. Not much was known about him since, but he appears in the sequel.
 President D. - The CEO of the Mad Company and the game's main villain, President D. started Mad Company to study and work with Dark Matter, in hopes of creating the ultimate glade, the Dark Draglade. When the glade was completed, he activated its power, going insane in the process. After the player beats him once, he tries to get more power from the Dark Matter and became a giant monster, though he is returned to normal after the player character beats him a second time. Ultimately, he dies after his defeat by the effect of the Dark Matter.
 Pudding - A young girl and boss of the DoraDora Dan. She appears in everyone's story but plays a much bigger role in Kyle's. When meeting her for the first time, she sends her servants to take out the playing character. Her company has made gun-type G- Cons which shoot out a golem type glade. Apart from in Kyle's story she cannot be fought because she has forgotten her G-Con. She hates being called a child or baby and claims she is mature.

Sequel
A sequel was released in Japan called Custom Beat Battle: Draglade 2 in 2008.

References

External links
Bandai Namco and Banpresto's Official Draglade Site

Metacritic review Aggregation

505 Games games
2007 video games
Fighting role-playing video games
Atlus games
Banpresto games
Bandai Namco Entertainment franchises
Dimps games
Fighting games
Music video games
Nintendo DS games
Nintendo DS-only games
Video games developed in Japan
Single-player video games